Crépy-en-Valois is a railway station serving Crépy-en-Valois, Oise department, northern France. The station is served by regional trains to Paris, Soissons and Laon.

References

Railway stations in Oise
Railway stations in France opened in 1871